The 2010 Wisconsin Badgers football team represented the University of Wisconsin–Madison in the 2010 NCAA Division I FBS football season. The Badgers, led by fifth-year head coach Bret Bielema, were members of the Big Ten Conference and played their home games at Camp Randall Stadium. They finished the season 11–2, 7–1 in the Big Ten to be crowned Big Ten co-champions along with Michigan State. Due to being ranked the highest of the three schools in the BCS rankings at the end of the season, the Badgers earned the conference's automatic bid to the Rose Bowl, where they were defeated 21–19 by TCU.

Schedule

Rankings

Roster

Regular season

UNLV

San Jose State

Arizona State

A blocked PAT was the difference in a crazy game in Camp Randall Stadium. Both Arizona State and Wisconsin were undefeated heading into this game, Arizona State having beaten a pair of FCS teams and Wisconsin having beaten UNLV and San Jose State. The Badgers managed to overcome a sluggish start and fended off an upset bid by the Sun Devils.

Arizona State would be marred by mistakes, committing multiple penalties on offense and defense, and Wisconsin used Arizona State's gaffes to keep themselves in the game. The Sun Devils returned a kick for a touchdown, had a very long runback on a kick to end the half (the returner was tackled inside the one-yard line as time expired), and had a punt return for a touchdown called back due to a pair of illegal blocks. Wisconsin did not commit a single turnover, and that would ultimately help to decide this game.

Wisconsin improved to 3–0 on the season, and faces FCS opponent Austin Peay next week. Arizona State, however, falls to 2–1 and will need to win 5 Pac-10 games to become bowl-eligible.

Austin Peay

Wisconsin broke the all-time record for most points scored with 70, breaking a record from the 1962 season (the Badgers defeated New Mexico State 69–13 that season).

Michigan State

In a matchup between undefeated teams in the Big Ten, Michigan State prevailed over the 9th ranked Badgers. Despite 3 Spartan turnovers, the Badgers were unable to come away with a road win, dropping head coach Bret Bielema to 0–2 in Spartan Stadium and 2–2 against Michigan State overall. The Spartans face their rival, the Michigan Wolverines in a crucial road contest next week, while the Badgers face longtime rival Minnesota in the battle for Paul Bunyan's Axe.

Minnesota

Wisconsin won a school-record 7th straight game over the rival Golden Gophers, dropping Tim Brewster to 0–4 against Wisconsin and improving Bret Bielema to 5–0 against Minnesota. Wisconsin did not commit a turnover for the 4th game in a row, and had two running backs with over 100 yards rushing (James White and John Clay). Minnesota has now lost 5 straight games after winning their opener against Middle Tennessee State.

Ohio State

Wisconsin stunned the top-ranked Buckeyes 31–18, their first upset of a top-ranked team since a 1981 defeat of #1 ranked Michigan. Wisconsin Senior WR David Gilreath returned the opening kick of the game for a touchdown, RB John Clay became the first running back to go over 100 yards rushing against the Buckeyes since Joe McKnight of USC in 2008, and Wisconsin's defense harried Ohio State QB Terrelle Pryor all game long. The Badgers ran up 21 unanswered points in the first half before Devin Barclay of Ohio State answered with a field goal. The Buckeyes managed to get 15 more points (via a pair of Daniel Herron touchdown runs) but the Badgers iced their incredible upset of the Buckeyes with a TD run by James White and a Philip Welch field goal. The win over Ohio State is Bret Bielema's first; he was 0–3 against the Buckeyes in the previous three meetings (2007, 2008, and 2009). The loss dropped Jim Tressel to 4–4 against Wisconsin and snapped a 3-game Buckeye winning streak over the Badgers.

Iowa

11th ranked Wisconsin won a narrow 31–30 contest over the Iowa Hawkeyes. The Hawkeyes went into the half with a 13–10 lead, but the Badgers chipped away at it and took a 24–20 lead. The Hawkeyes managed a touchdown and field goal of their own to take a 30–24 lead in the 4th quarter. However, the Badgers scored the go-ahead touchdown on an 8-yard run by running back Montee Ball. With under a minute remaining, Iowa drove into Wisconsin territory on their final possession, but Iowa RB Adam Robinson was tackled before he could get out of bounds. Unable to stop the clock, Iowa ran out of time, giving Wisconsin head coach Bret Bielema his first-ever road win over a ranked opponent. It was also his 3rd win over Iowa and 2nd in Iowa City, breaking a two-game Hawkeye winning streak.

Purdue

Wisconsin traveled to West Lafayette to play the Purdue Boilermakers. Purdue entered the game on a two-game losing streak (losing 49–0 at Ohio State and 44–10 at Illinois), but managed to take a 10–3 lead on the Badgers before the end of the first half. An interception by Badger QB Scott Tolzien on Wisconsin's first possession of the game and a missed field goal by Wisconsin K Philip Welch helped the Boilermakers take a 10–6 lead at the half.

From there, Wisconsin took command of the game. Purdue Freshman QB Sean Robinson threw an interception on the first possession of the half that set the Badgers up with excellent field position. Badger QB Scott Tolzien capitalized on the turnover, finding freshman WR Jared Abbrederis on a 7-yard touchdown strike that gave the Badgers their first lead of the game at 13–10. After an exchange of punts, the Badgers again found the end zone on a 31-yard touchdown run by RB Montee Ball, extending their lead to 20–10. Purdue K Carson Wiggs tightened the game by kicking a field goal to cut the Badger lead 20–13. However, those would be the last points of the game for the Boilermakers. Wisconsin would get another touchdown run from Ball and an interception returned for a touchdown by CB Antonio Fenelus.

The Badgers won their fifth straight game over Purdue, and their 8th game of the season overall. They play Indiana in Camp Randall on November 13. After a 2–0 start to conference play, Purdue has lost their last three games. They play Michigan in West Lafayette, having won their last two games against the Wolverines.

Indiana

Wisconsin did not punt on any of their offensive possessions, tallied a pair of 100-yard running backs (James White and Montee Ball) and overpowered the Indiana Hoosiers. At one point, the score was 10–10, but Wisconsin would score 7 consecutive touchdowns to take a 59–10 lead before Indiana managed to kick a field goal. The Badgers put in their backup players in the 4th Quarter, but their two backup quarterbacks (Jon Budmayr and Nate Tice) managed to score a pair of touchdowns anyway.

Badger QB Scott Tolzien completed 15 passes on 18 attempts with a trio of touchdown strikes. Montee Ball's 167 rushing yards and 3 rushing touchdowns on 22 carries led Wisconsin's ground game, and his teammate James White (who had not played against Purdue with a head injury) ran for 144 yards on 19 carries with two touchdowns of his own. Wisconsin S Aaron Henry returned an interception for a touchdown late in the game to put Wisconsin up by a commanding margin and icing their win over the Hoosiers.

Wisconsin's 83 points against Indiana easily broke their previous record 70 points scored against Austin Peay, which was set earlier this season. They play Michigan in Ann Arbor next week.

Michigan

    
    
    
    
    
    
    
    
    
    
    
    

Wisconsin would lead from start to finish of this game, shutting out the powerful Michigan Wolverine offense in the first half. The Badgers incredibly gained 380 yards of total offense in the first half. Wisconsin would close out the Wolverines from there; Michigan managed to cut Wisconsin's lead to just 10 points with a pair of back to back touchdowns. However, Wisconsin answered with a touchdown of its own. Michigan would score another 3rd-quarter touchdown, but the 4th quarter was where the Badgers took this game, outscoring the Wolverines 17–7 in the final 15:00.

Wisconsin running back Montee Ball ran for 4 touchdowns on 30 carries; his 194 yards paced a powerful Badger rushing attack. Badger QB Scott Tolzien completed 14 passes on 15 attempts for 201 yards as the Badgers diced up Michigan's vulnerable secondary. Wisconsin RB James White would run for 161 yards of his own and a pair of touchdowns; he and Ball combined for 6 rushing touchdowns and well over 300 yards of total offense.

Denard Robinson became the first QB to run for over 1,500 yards in a season, but he was unable to spark the Wolverines to a possible upset of a top ten Wisconsin team.

With the 48–28 win, Wisconsin won in Michigan Stadium for the first time since the 1994 season (when they defeated Michigan 31–19). Wisconsin also scored more points in the game than they had ever scored in any single game against the Wolverines prior to this date. The 10–1 Badgers are now looking at a potential Rose Bowl berth and BCS game, but must play a still-dangerous Northwestern Wildcats team in Camp Randall next weekend.

Northwestern

Wisconsin led by double digits just minutes into the game and never let go, blowing out the Wildcats en route to their eleventh victory of the season. Aided by 7 Northwestern turnovers, the Badgers played some of their best football of the season on Senior Day.

Wisconsin QB Scott Tolzien, who led the nation in passing completion percentage (74.3%) in the regular season, had an excellent game in his final home start. He completed 15 passes on 19 attempts for 230 yards with 4 touchdown passes. Tolzien was not sacked once in the game, and left to a standing ovation.

Wisconsin's running back duo of Montee Ball and James White tore apart Northwestern's defense on the ground, with 300+ combined rushing yards. James White eclipsed the 1,000 yards rushing mark for the season. Montee Ball's 4 touchdown runs paced the Badger ground game and he ran 20 times for 178 yards on the day.

The powerful Badger offensive line had one of its best games of the season, opening holes for the running game and protecting Scott Tolzien. Bill Nagy, John Moffitt, and Gabe Carimi put together fantastic games in their final home start. Badger TE Lance Kendricks caught 4 passes for 80 yards with an acrobatic touchdown catch, and WR David Gilreath scored his only receiving touchdown in the regular season on an 18-yard strike from Tolzien. Nick Toon caught a pair of touchdown passes as well.

Due to wins by Ohio State (over Michigan) and Michigan State (over Penn State), Wisconsin's win over Northwestern resulted in a tie between the teams with a 7–1 overall record. The Big Ten championship is thus split amongst the three teams, with the highest ranked team in the BCS going to the Rose Bowl.

TCU–Rose Bowl

Both teams scored double digit points in the first quarter, a Rose Bowl record. The game was close throughout, and was not decided until Wisconsin failed to convert a two-point conversion late in the fourth quarter to tie the game. It was the second time the game was decided by two points, joining the 1966 game (UCLA 14, Michigan State 12).

Regular starters

2010 stats

Passing
Note: G = Games played; COMP = Completions; ATT = Attempts; COMP % = Completion percentage; YDS = Passing yards; TD = Passing touchdowns; INT = Interceptions; EFF = Passing efficiency

Rushing
Note: G = Games played; ATT = Attempts; YDS = Yards; AVG = Average yard per carry; LG = Longest run; TD = Rushing touchdowns

Receiving
Note: G = Games played; REC = Receptions; YDS = Yards; AVG = Average yard per catch; LG = Longest catch; TD = Receiving touchdowns

Kick and punt returning
Note: G = Games played; PR = Punt returns; PYDS = Punt return yards; PLG = Punt return long; KR = Kick returns; KYDS = Kick return yards; KLG = Kick return long; TD = Total return touchdowns

Kicking
Note: G = Games played; FGM = Field goals made; FGA = Field goals attempted; LG = Field goal long; XPT = Extra points made; XPT ATT = XPT attempted; TP = Total points

Punting
Note: G = Games played; P = Punts; YDS = Yards; AVG = Average per punt; LG = Punt long; In20 = Punts inside the 20; TB = Touchbacks

Defensive
Note: G = Games played; Solo = Solo tackles; Ast = Assisted tackles; Total = Total tackles; TFL-Yds = Tackles for loss-yards lost; Sack = Sacks; INT = Interceptions; PD = Passes defended; FF = Forced fumbles; FR = Forced recoveries

2011 NFL Draft

2011 NFL Draft class

Signed undrafted free agents
 DB Niles Brinkley, Pittsburgh Steelers
 RB John Clay, Pittsburgh Steelers
 WR David Gilreath, Indianapolis Colts
 LB Blake Sorensen, Seattle Seahawks
 QB Scott Tolzien, San Diego Chargers

References

Wisconsin
Wisconsin Badgers football seasons
Big Ten Conference football champion seasons
Wisconsin Badgers football